Ardu may refer to:

 Ardu, Estonia
 Ardú Vocal Ensemble, an Irish a cappella group
 Aircraft Research and Development Unit, of the Royal Australian Air Force
 Mimí Ardú (born 1956), Argentinian actress and vedette

See also
 Ardue, County Cavan, Ireland
 Urdu, official language of Pakistan